Aloha Stadium is a closed multi-purpose stadium located in Halawa, Hawaii, a western suburb of Honolulu (though with a Honolulu address). It is the largest stadium in the state of Hawaii.  , the stadium ceased fan-attended operations indefinitely, and placed a moratorium on the scheduling of new events.

Aloha Stadium served as home to the University of Hawaii Rainbow Warriors football team (Mountain West Conference, NCAA Division I FBS) for the 1975 through 2020 seasons. It also hosted college football's Hawaii Bowl (2002–2019) and Hula Bowl (1976–1997, 2006–2008, 2020–2021), and formerly was home to the National Football League's Pro Bowl from 1980 through 2016 (except in 2010 and 2015). It also hosted numerous high school football games, and served as a venue for large concerts and events, including high school graduation ceremonies. The stadium was home field for the AAA Hawaii Islanders of the Pacific Coast League (PCL) from 1975 to 1987, before the team moved to Colorado Springs. Frequent swap meets in the stadium's parking lot often draw large crowds.

History

Before 1975, Honolulu's main outdoor stadium had been Honolulu Stadium, a wooden stadium on King Street. However, it had reached the end of its useful life by the 1960s, and was well below the standards for Triple-A baseball. Constructed of steel, the stadium was nicknamed the "Metal Mecca". The baseball field is aligned north-northwest (home plate to centerfield), as is the football field.

The first sporting event at Aloha Stadium was a college football game between Hawaii and Texas A&I (now Texas A&M-Kingsville) on September 13, 1975. Played on Saturday night, the crowd was 32,247, and the visitors prevailed,

The final sporting event held in Aloha Stadium was the 2021 Hula Bowl. The last points scored at Aloha Stadium were a “pick 6” touchdown scored by Carlo Kemp of the University of Michigan.

The stadium was somewhat problematic for its initial primary tenant, the minor league baseball Hawaii Islanders. Located in west-central Oahu, it was far from the team's fan base, and many were unwilling to make the drive. Additionally, while local public transportation (TheBus) stopped at the main gate of Honolulu Stadium, the stop for Aloha Stadium was located some distance from the gate.  As a result, attendance plummeted and never really recovered—a major factor in the franchise's ultimate move to the mainland.

Additionally, stadium management initially refused to allow the use of metal spikes on the AstroTurf. During a game in early May 1976, the starting pitcher for the Tacoma Twins, Bill Butler, wore metal spikes to comply with a directive from Tacoma's parent club. In response, stadium management turned off the center field lights, and after 35 minutes, umpires forfeited the game to the Twins. The Islanders protested, claiming they had no control over the lights. However, the Pacific Coast League (PCL) sided with the Twins, citing a league rule that the home team is responsible for providing acceptable playing facilities. After the teams ended the season in a tie for first in the PCL's Western Division, Hawaii won a one-game playoff in Tacoma.

As originally built, Aloha Stadium had various configurations for different sport venues and other purposes. Four movable 7,000-seat sections, each  could move using air casters into a diamond configuration for baseball (also used for soccer), an oval for football, or a triangle for concerts.  In January 2007, the stadium was permanently locked into its football configuration due to cost and maintenance issues.  An engineer from Rolair Systems, the NASA spin-off company that engineered the system, claims that the problem was caused by a concrete contractor that ignored specifications for the concrete pads under the stadium.

Concerns
There have been numerous discussions with Hawaii lawmakers who are concerned with the physical condition of the stadium. There are several issues regarding rusting of the facility, several hundred seats that need to be replaced, and restroom facilities that need to be expanded to accommodate more patrons.  Much of the rust is due to building the stadium with weathering steel.  It was intended to create a protective patina that would eliminate the need for painting. However, the designers did not reckon with Honolulu's ocean-salt laden climate. As a result, the steel has never stopped rusting.

A 2005 study by Honolulu engineering firm Wiss, Janney, Elstner Associates, Inc. determined that the stadium required $99 million to be completely restored and an additional $115 million for ongoing maintenance and refurbishment over the next 20 years to extend its useful life.  In early 2007, the state legislature proposed to spend $300 million to build a new facility as opposed to spending approximately $216 million to extend the life of Aloha Stadium for another  years.

One council member said that if immediate repairs are not made within the next seven years, then the stadium would probably have to be demolished due to safety concerns. In May 2007, the state allotted $12.4 million to be used towards removing corrosion and rust from the structure.

Expansion and improvements
In 2003, the stadium surface was changed from AstroTurf (which had been in place since the stadium opened) to FieldTurf. In July 2011, the field was replaced with an Act Global UBU Sports Speed S5-M synthetic turf system.

In 2008, the state of Hawaii approved the bill of $185 million to refurbish the aging Aloha Stadium.  In 2010, Aloha Stadium completely retrofitted its scoreboard and video screen to be more up to date with its high definition capability. The Aloha Stadium Authority planned to add more luxury suites, replacing all seats, rusting treatments, parking lots, more restrooms, pedestrian bridge supports, an enclosed lounge, and more. There was also a proposal that would have enclosed the four openings in the corners of the stadium to add more seats.

In 2011, the playing field was refurbished in part due to a naming rights sponsorship from Hawaiian Airlines. As a result of the sponsorship deal, the field was referred to as Hawaiian Airlines Field at Aloha Stadium. The airline did not renew sponsorship after the deal expired in 2016. As a result, the field went unnamed until late August, when Hawaiian Tel Federal Credit Union signed a three-year $275,000 agreement. As of 2016, the field was known as Hawaiian Tel Federal Credit Union Field at Aloha Stadium.

In early 2017, there was a study in the Honolulu Star-Advertiser about replacing Aloha Stadium due to safety concerns and a liability risk. The plan is to build a smaller 30,000 seat stadium on the existing property and also build commercial development around the stadium. In theory, it would save the state millions of dollars instead of renovating and keep the existing stadium as it is.

In July 2019, Governor of Hawaii David Ige signed Act 268 into law, appropriating $350 million for an Aloha Stadium redevelopment project. The funds will go toward the construction of a new stadium and land development, including a mixed-use sports and entertainment complex.

Closure to new events
A December 17, 2020, announcement by the Aloha Stadium Authority stated that the stadium would be ceasing fan-attended operations indefinitely. The closure was related to financial issues caused by the COVID-19 pandemic. The stadium, built in 1975, was also plagued by maintenance issues in recent years. A 2019 story from the Honolulu Star-Advertiser noted that the stadium needed $30 million in repairs. KHON-TV reported that the stadium would be condemned and was deemed unsafe to hold any crowds at all. The scheduling of new events was also halted. In January 2021, the University of Hawaii announced that the Rainbow Warriors football team would play their home games on campus "for at least the next three years".

New stadium

The New Aloha Stadium is a proposed 35,000-seat multi-purpose stadium to be built in Halawa, Hawaii, for the Hawaii Rainbow Warriors football program, with demolition of the old stadium expected to begin in early 2023. The area around the stadium will also include entertainment venues, retail stores, restaurants, housing, hotels, recreational sites, cultural amenities, and green space. It will replace, and be constructed on the site of, the current Aloha Stadium.

Events

American football

College football
Aloha Stadium served as the home field of the Hawaii Rainbow Warriors college football program, representing the University of Hawaiʻi at Mānoa, from 1975 through 2020.

The Hula Bowl, a college football all-star game, was first played at the stadium in January 1976 and returned to the stadium annually through 1997. It was again held at Aloha Stadium in 2006–2008 and 2020–2021. The 2021 Hula Bowl was the last football game held at the facility before the halting of new events.

Three team-competitive college football bowl games were held annually at the stadium: the Aloha Bowl (1982–2000), Oahu Bowl (1998–2000), and Hawaii Bowl (2002–2019). The Hawaii Rainbow Warriors appeared in the Hawaii Bowl nine times and the other two bowl games once each.

Professional football
Starting in September 1975, the stadium was home to the World Football League's Hawaiians who played their last four home games there. The San Francisco 49ers and the San Diego Chargers played an NFL preseason game at Aloha Stadium on August 21, 1976. In August 2019, the NFL returned to the stadium with a preseason game between the Los Angeles Rams and Dallas Cowboys.

The National Football League's all-star game, the Pro Bowl, was held annually at the stadium from 1980 through 2016, except in 2010 and 2015.

Baseball
The stadium served as the home field for the Hawaii Islanders, a Triple-A team competing in the Pacific Coast League, from 1976 to 1987.

In , a three-game regular season series between St. Louis Cardinals and San Diego Padres of Major League Baseball  (MLB) was held at the stadium. Called the Padres Paradise Series, the series was played as a doubleheader on April 19 and a nationally broadcast (ESPN) game on April 20. In 1979, the Padres had played a three-game preseason series against the Seibu Lions of Japan's Pacific League at the stadium.

Soccer
On April 7, 1976, the Aloha Soccer Festival triple-header was held at the stadium. In the feature match, Pele scored four goals as his New York Cosmos defeated Japan, 5-0, in front of a crowd of 21,705. (In the other matches, the NASL's San Diego Jaws routed the Hawaii All-Stars, 6-0, while the Philippines edged Taiwan, 1-0.)

Encouraged by the tournament's success, the San Antonio Thunder became Team Hawaii in 1977, bringing the NASL to the Aloha State. Pele and the Cosmos returned on April 13, 1977, as 12,877 watched New York defeat Hawaii, 2-1. (None of Team Hawaii's other twelve home games drew even half of that; they managed only 4,543 per game for the season, and moved to Tulsa in 1978.)

Aloha Stadium hosted the inaugural Pan-Pacific Championship (February 20–23, 2008), a knockout soccer tournament, involving four teams from Japan's J-League, North America's Major League Soccer (MLS) and Australia/New Zealand's A-League. The 2012 Hawaiian Islands Invitational was also held at the venue.

The United States women's national soccer team was scheduled to play a game against Trinidad and Tobago as part of their World Cup Winning Victory Tour at the stadium on December 6, 2015; however, the game was canceled the day before gameday due to concerns over the turf being unsafe to play on.

Rugby league
On June 2, 2013, the stadium played host to a rugby league test match where Samoa defeated the USA 34–10.

In June, the Brisbane Broncos from the Australasian-based National Rugby League (NRL) competition organized for a rugby league match to be played at Aloha Stadium against NRL rivals Penrith Panthers later in 2015. However, in September the NRL blocked the idea and the game didn't go ahead.

Major League Rugby
As of mid-2020, Kanaloa Hawai’i, a proposed Major League Rugby team, was planned to be based at Aloha Stadium.

Graduation ceremonies
Aloha Stadium is also the venue for five public high school graduation ceremonies: Radford High School, Mililani High School, Aiea High School, James Campbell High School, and Pearl City High School.

Concerts

See also
 List of NCAA Division I FBS football stadiums
 Weathering steel

References

External links

 

American football venues in Hawaii
Baseball venues in Hawaii
College football venues
Defunct minor league baseball venues
Defunct baseball venues in the United States
Hawaii Rainbow Warriors football
High school football venues in the United States
NCAA bowl game venues
North American Soccer League (1968–1984) stadiums
Rugby league stadiums in the United States
The Hawaiians
Aloha
Soccer venues in Hawaii
Sports in Honolulu
Sports venues completed in 1975
Buildings and structures in Honolulu
Tourist attractions in Honolulu
1975 establishments in Hawaii
Kanaloa Hawai’i